Large for gestational age (LGA) is a term used to describe infants that are born with an abnormally high weight, specifically in the 90th percentile or above, compared to other babies of the same developmental age. Macrosomia is a similar term that describes excessive birth weight, but refers to an absolute measurement, regardless of gestational age.

Evaluating an infant for macrosomia or LGA can help identify risks associated with their birth, including labor complications of both the parent and the child, potential long-term health complications of the child, and infant mortality.

Signs and symptoms 
Fetal macrosomia and LGA often do not present with noticeable patient symptoms. Important signs include large fundal height (uterus size) and excessive amniotic fluid (polyhydramnios). Fundal height can be measured from the top of the uterus to the pubic bone and indicates that the newborn is likely large in volume. Excessive amniotic fluid indicates that the fetus’ urine output is larger than expected, indicating a larger baby than normal; some symptoms of excessive amniotic fluid include

shortness of breath
swelling of lower extremities & abdominal wall
uterine discomfort or contractions
fetal malposition, such as breech presentation.

Complications 
LGA or macrosomic births can lead to complications for both the mother and the infant.

Infant complications 
Common risks in LGA babies include shoulder dystocia, hypoglycemia, brachial plexus injuries, metatarsus adductus, hip subluxation and talipes calcaneovalgus, due to intrauterine deformation.

Shoulder dystocia occurs when the infant's shoulder becomes impacted on the mother's pubic symphysis during birth. Newborns with shoulder dystocia are at risk of temporary or permanent nerve damage to the baby's arm, or other injuries such as fracture. Both increased birth weight and diabetes in the gestational parent are independent risk factors seen to increase risk of shoulder dystocia. Although larger babies are at higher risk for shoulder dystocia, most cases of shoulder dystocia happen in smaller babies because there are many more small and normal-size babies being born than large babies.

LGA babies are at higher risk of hypoglycemia in the neonatal period, independent of whether the mother has diabetes. Hypoglycemia, as well as hyperbilirubinemia and polycythemia, occur as a result of hyperinsulinemia in the fetus.

High birth weight may also impact the baby in the long term as studies have shown associations with increased risk of overweight, obesity, and type 2 diabetes mellitus. Studies have shown that the long-term overweight risk is doubled when the birth weight is greater than 4,000 g. The risk of type 2 diabetes mellitus as an adult is 19% higher babies weighing more than 4,500 g at birth compared to those with birth weights between 4,000 g and 4,500 g.

Pregnant mother complications 
Complications of the pregnant mother include: emergency cesarean section, postpartum hemorrhage, and obstetric anal sphincter injury. Compared to pregnancies without macrosomia, pregnant women giving birth to newborns weighing between 4,000 grams and 4,500 grams are at two times greater risk of complications, and those giving birth to infants over 4,500 grams are at three times greater risk.

Causes 
Multiple factors have been shown to increase likelihood of infant macrosomia including: preexisting obesity, diabetes, or dyslipidemia of the mother, gestational diabetes, post-term pregnancy, prior history of a macrosomic birth, genetics, and other factors.

Risk factors

Diabetes of the mother 
One of the primary risk factors of LGA births and macrosomia is poorly-controlled maternal diabetes, particularly gestational diabetes (GD), as well as preexisting type 2 diabetes mellitus (DM). The risk of having a macrosomic fetus is three times greater in mothers with diabetes than those without diabetes.

Obesity in the mother 
Obesity prior to pregnancy and maternal weight gain above recommended guidelines during pregnancy are another key risk factor for macrosomia or LGA infants.  It has been demonstrated that while maternal obesity and gestational diabetes are independent risk factors for LGA and macrosomia, they can act synergistically, with even higher risk of macrosomia when both are present.

Genetics 
Genetics can also play a role in having an LGA baby and it is seen that taller, heavier parents tend to have larger babies. Genetic disorders of overgrowth (e.g. Beckwith–Wiedemann syndrome, Sotos syndrome, Perlman syndrome, Simpson-Golabi-Behmel syndrome) are often characterized by macrosomia.

Other risk factors 

Gestational age: pregnancies that go beyond 40 weeks increase incidence of an LGA infant
 Fetal sex: male infants tend to weigh more than female infants
 Multiparity: giving birth to previous LGA infants vs. non-LGA infants
 Frozen embryo transfer as fertility treatment, as compared with fresh embryo transfer or no artificial assistance

Mechanism 
How each of these factors leads to excess fetal growth is complex and not completed understood.

Traditionally, the Pedersen hypothesis has been used to explain the mechanism in which uncontrolled gestational diabetes can lead to macrosomia, and many aspects of it have been confirmed with further studies. This explanation proposes that impaired glucose control in the mother leads to a hyperglycemic state for the fetus, which leads to a hyperinsulinemia response, in turn causing increased glucose metabolism, fat deposition, and excess growth.

It has also been shown that different patterns of excess fetal growth are seen in diabetic associated macrosomia compared to other predisposing factors, suggesting different underlying mechanisms. Specifically, macrosomic infants associated with glucose abnormalities are seen to have increased body fat, larger shoulders and abdominal circumference.

Diagnosis 

Diagnosing fetal macrosomia cannot be performed until after birth, as evaluating a baby's weight in the womb may be inaccurate. While ultrasound has been the primary method for diagnosing LGA, this form of fetal weight assessment remains imprecise, as the fetus is a highly variable structure in regards to density and weight— no matter the gestational age. Ultrasonography involves an algorithm that incorporates biometric measurements of the fetus, such as biparietal diameter (BPD), head circumference (HC), abdominal circumference (AC), and femur length (FL), to calculate the estimated fetal weight (EFW). Variability of fetal weight estimations has been linked to differences due to sensitivity and specificity of ultrasound algorithms as well as to the individual performing the ultrasound examination.

In addition to sonography, fetal weight can also be assessed using clinical and maternal methods. Clinical methods for estimating fetal weight involves measuring the mother's symphysis-fundal height and performing Leopold's maneuvers, which can help with determining the fetus position in utero in addition to size. However, as this method relies heavily on practitioner experience and technique, it does not provide an accurate and definite diagnosis of an LGA infant and only would only serve as a potential indication of suspected macrosomia. Fetal weight can also be estimated through a mother's subjective assessment of the fetus size, but this method is dependent on a mother's experience with past pregnancies and may not be clinically useful. There are new methods being studied for their accuracy in predicting fetal weight, such as measuring fetal soft tissue, but more research needs to be done to find a consistent, reliable method.

Prevention 
LGA and fetal macrosomia associated with poor glycemic control can be prevented by effective blood glucose management below a mean blood glucose level of 100 mg/dl before and during pregnancy; additionally, closely monitoring weight gain and diet during pregnancy can help to prevent LGA and fetal macrosomia. Women with obesity that undergo weight loss can greatly decrease their chances of having a macrosomic or LGA infant. Additionally, regular prenatal care and routine check-ups with one's physician are important in planning pregnancy, especially if one has obesity, diabetes, hypertension, or other conditions before conception.

Screening 
Most screening for LGA and macrosomia occurs during prenatal check-ups, where both fundal height and ultrasound scans can give an approximate measurement of the baby's proportions. Two-dimensional ultrasound can be used to screen for macrosomia and LGA but estimations are generally not precise at any gestational age until birth.

Management 
Induction of labor at or near term for women with a baby of suspected macrosomia has been proposed as a treatment method, as it stops fetal growth and results in babies with a lower birth weight, fewer bone fractures, and less incidence of shoulder dystocia. However, this method could increase the number of women with perineal tears, and failed inductions can prompt the need for emergency cesarean sections. LGA babies are more than two times likely to be delivered by Cesarean section, compared to infants under 4000 grams (below the threshold of macrosomia). Predicting a baby's weight can be inaccurate and women could be worried unnecessarily, and request their labor to be induced without a medical reason. Doctors disagree whether women should be induced for suspected macrosomia and more research is needed to find out what is best for women and their babies.

Elective cesarean section has also been presented as a potential delivery method for infants of suspected macrosomia, as it can serve to prevent possible birth trauma. However, the American College of Obstetricians and Gynecologists recommends that cesarean delivery should only be considered if the fetus is an estimated weight of at least 5,000 grams in non-diabetic mothers and at least 4,500 grams in diabetic mothers. A number needed to treat analysis determined that approximately 3,700 women with suspected fetal macrosomia would have to undergo an unnecessary cesarean section in order to prevent one incident of brachial plexus injuries secondary to shoulder dystocia.

Management of gestational diabetes through dietary modifications and anti-diabetic medications has been shown to decrease the incidence of LGA. The use of metformin to control maternal blood glucose levels has shown to be more effective than using insulin alone in reducing the likelihood of fetal macrosomia. There is a 20% lower chance of having an LGA baby when using metformin to manage diabetes compared to using insulin.

Modifiable risk factors that increase the incidence of LGA births, such as gestational weight gain above recommended BMI guidelines, can be managed with lifestyle modifications, including maintaining a balanced diet and exercising. Such interventions can help mothers achieve the recommended gestational weight and lower the incidence of fetal macrosomia in obese and overweight women. The World Health Organization also recommends that mothers aim for their recommended BMI prior to conception. In general, obese mothers or women with excessive gestational weight gain may have higher risk of pregnancy complications (ranging from LGA, shoulder dystocia, etc.).

Epidemiology 
In healthy pregnancies without pre-term or post-term health complications, large for gestational age, or fetal macrosomia have been observed to affect around 12% of newborns. By comparison, women with gestational diabetes are at an increased risk of giving birth to LGA babies, where ~15-45% of neonates may be affected. In 2017, the National Center of Health Statistics found that 7.8% of live-born infants born in the United States meet the definition of macrosomia, where their birth weight surpasses the threshold of 4000 grams (above ~8.8 pounds). Women in Europe and the United States tend to have higher pre-term body weight and have increased gestational weight during pregnancy compared to women in east Asia. Thus, women in Europe and the United States, with higher gestational weight gain, tend to have higher associated risk of LGA infants, macrosomia and cesarean. In European countries, the prevalence of births of newborns weighing between 4,000 g and 4,499 g is 8% to 21%, and in Asian countries the prevalence is between 1% and 8%. In general, rates of LGA infants have increased 15-25% in many countries including the United States, Canada, Germany, Denmark, Scotland and more in the past 20–30 years, suggesting an increase in LGA births worldwide.

References

External links 

Disorders related to length of gestation and fetal growth
Neonatology